The otonari Fukuoka Suns are an American football team located in Hakata-ku, Fukuoka Japan.  They are a member of the X-League.

Team history
2017 team founded as the Fukuoka Suns. Finished first in the X3 West division (6 wins, 0 losses).
2018 team name changed to Opatsu Fukuoka Suns. Finished first in X2 West division (5 wins, 0 losses). Defeated Sidewinders in X2-X1 promotion match 22-7
2019 team name changed to Me-Life Fukuoka Suns
2021 team name changed to Equal One Fukuoka Suns
2022 team name changed to otonari Fukuoka Suns

Seasons
{| class="wikitable"
|bgcolor="#FFCCCC"|X-League Champions (1987–present)
|bgcolor="#DDFFDD"|<small>Division Champions</small>
|bgcolor="#D0E7FF"|Final Stage/Semifinals Berth
|bgcolor="#96CDCD"|Wild Card /First Stage Berth
|}

Current Import PlayersFormer Import Players'''

References

External links
  (Japanese)

American football in Japan
2017 establishments in Japan
American football teams established in 2017
X-League teams